Georges Mayrand (August 21, 1876 – January 20, 1951) was a Canadian politician.

Born in Saint-Charles-de-Grondines, Quebec, Mayrand was elected to the Legislative Assembly of Quebec for Montréal-Dorion in 1912. A Liberal, he was re-elected in 1916 and defeated in 1919.

He died in Montreal in 1951.

References

1876 births
1951 deaths
Quebec Liberal Party MNAs